Aaron Flood is a former Kildare Gaelic footballer.

Playing career
Flood represented Kildare GAA at senior level in the O'Byrne Cup and the NFL from 2005 to 2008. He previously played as a Ruck rover for the Ireland national Australian rules football team, that won the 2001 Atlantic Alliance Cup and 2002 Australian Football International Cup. He was one of Ireland's best on ground in the final against Papua New Guinea and was also selected on the International cup All-Star Team.

References 

Living people
Kildare inter-county Gaelic footballers
Gaelic footballers who switched code
Irish players of Australian rules football
Year of birth missing (living people)